Russell Gaelic Union, Downpatrick is a Gaelic football and ladies' Gaelic football club based in Downpatrick, County Down, Northern Ireland.

History

The first Gaelic Athletic Association club in Downpatrick was founded in 1896, Clan Na Gael, mostly a hurling team. Gaelic football began to be popular in the 1910s. The games were outlawed during the Irish War of Independence (1918–22), but teams were refounded in 1924 and the St Patrick club affiliated in 1926.

Downpatrick won their first Down Senior Football Championship in 1935. In 1938–39 they moved to Leatham's field at Ballymote and renamed themselves The Thomas Russell Club, after Thomas Russell (1767–1803), executed at Downpatrick for his role in the Irish rebellion of 1803. Players were harassed by policemen of the Royal Ulster Constabulary, who uprooted their goalposts and sent officers to their games to intimidate them. In 1949 they became the Russell Gaelic Union.

Russell Gaelic Union won further county titles in 1972 and 1978

In the 1990s the team experienced great success both at a team level with RGU Downpatrick and more widely on the Down county team. Downpatrick won three county titles in four years, and reached the final of the 1993 Ulster Senior Club Football Championship, losing to Errigal Ciarán.

A ladies' team was founded in 1997.

In 2015 the club's grounds on Old Course Road were named as Down's second grounds (after Páirc Esler in Newry) and received £10,000 in funding from Down District Council.

RGU Downpatrick attracted some minor controversial press comment in 2018 when a brawl broke out at a league match against Ballyholland Harps. Both clubs were banned from the 2019 championship.

Honours

Gaelic football
Down Senior Football Championship (6): 1935, 1972, 1978, 1990, 1991, 1993
Down Intermediate Football Championship (1): 2005
Down Junior Football Championship (2): 1961, 1984
Down Minor Football Championship (7): 1961, 1962, 1969, 1971, 1972, 1976, 1983

Hurling
Down Junior Hurling Championship (1): 1945

References

External links
Official page

Gaelic games clubs in County Down
Gaelic football clubs in County Down